Jackie Northam is an International Affairs correspondent for National Public Radio (NPR). The veteran journalist spent more than a decade as a foreign correspondent in Europe, Asia and Africa covering conflict and geopolitical upheavals. Her current beat blends foreign policy and global economics. She now resides in Washington, D.C.

Career
Jackie Northam is NPR's International Affairs Correspondent. She is a veteran journalist who has spent three decades reporting on conflict, geopolitics, and life across the globe - from the mountains of Afghanistan and the desert sands of Saudi Arabia, to the gritty prison camp at Guantanamo Bay and the pristine beauty of the Arctic.

Northam spent more than a dozen years as an international correspondent living in London, Budapest, Bangkok, Phnom Penh, and Nairobi.  She charted the fall of communism in Eastern Europe and the Soviet Union, reported from Iraq after the fall of Saddam Hussein, and the rise of Saudi Arabia's powerful Crown Prince Mohammed bin Salman. She was in Islamabad to cover the Taliban recapturing Afghanistan

Her work has taken her to conflict zones around the world. Northam covered the 1994 genocide in Rwanda, arriving in the country just four days after Hutu extremists began slaughtering ethnic Tutsis. In Afghanistan, she accompanied Green Berets on a precarious mission to take a Taliban base. In Cambodia, she reported from Khmer Rouge strongholds.

Throughout her career, Northam has revealed the human experience behind the headlines, from the courage of Afghan villagers defying militant death threats to cast their vote in a national election, or exhausted rescue workers desperately searching for survivors following a massive earthquake in Haiti. 
 
Northam joined NPR in 2000 as National Security Correspondent, covering defense and intelligence policies at the height of the wars in Iraq and Afghanistan.  She led the network's coverage of the Abu Ghraib abuse scandal and the military prison at Guantanamo Bay, Cuba. Her present beat focuses on the complex relationship between geopolitics and the global economy, including efforts to counter China's rising power.
Northam has received multiple journalism awards, including Associated Press and Edward R. Murrow awards, and was part of the NPR team that won an Alfred I. duPont-Columbia University Award for "The DNA Files," a series about the science of genetics.
A native of Canada, Northam spends her time off crewing in the summer, on the ski hills in the winter, and on long walks year-round with her beloved beagle, Tara.

Awards and honors
Northam has received a number of awards in journalism throughout her career which include:
Associated Press awards
Edward R. Murrow awards
Alfred I. duPont-Columbia University Award

References

American women journalists
Living people
Year of birth missing (living people)
21st-century American women